The Journal of Law, Medicine & Ethics is a quarterly peer-reviewed academic medical journal covering medical ethics and medical law. It was established in 1981 as Law, Medicine & Health Care, which itself was formed by the merger of two journals: Medicolegal News and Nursing Law & Ethics. The journal obtained its current name in 1993. It is published by SAGE in partnership with the American Society of Law, Medicine & Ethics. The editor is Edward J. Hutchinson. The editor-in-chief is Aaron S. Kesselheim, MD, JD, MPH. According to the Journal Citation Reports, the journal has a 2017 impact factor of 0.986, ranking it 25th out of 51 journals in the category "Ethics".

See also 
 List of ethics journals

References

External links

Bioethics journals
Publications established in 1981
Wiley (publisher) academic journals
Quarterly journals
Medical law journals